Ust-Orda Buryat Autonomous Okrug was a federal subject of Russia until December 31, 2007.  On January 1, 2008, it was merged with Irkutsk Oblast.  During the transitional period of 2008–2009, it retained a special status within Irkutsk Oblast.

Districts:
Alarsky
with 17 rural administrations under the district's jurisdiction.
Bayandayevsky
with 12 rural administrations under the district's jurisdiction.
Bokhansky
with 13 rural administrations under the district's jurisdiction. Administrative center Bokhan (population 5425 as of 2002).
Ekhirit-Bulagatsky
with 13 rural administrations under the district's jurisdiction.
Nukutsky
with 10 rural administrations under the district's jurisdiction.
Osinsky
with 12 rural administrations under the district's jurisdiction.

References

Irkutsk Oblast
Ust-Orda